The Guangzhou–Kunming Expressway, designated as G80 and commonly referred to as the Guangkun Expressway is an expressway in China that connects the cities of Guangzhou, Guangdong, and Kunming, Yunnan. When complete, it will be  in length.

The section of roadway from Suolongshi, Mile County, Honghe Hani and Yi Autonomous Prefecture, Yunnan to Shilin Yi Autonomous County still follows China National Highway 326 which is not a grade-separated expressway. It is currently being upgraded to expressway standards.

References

AH1
Chinese national-level expressways
Expressways in Guangdong
Expressways in Guangxi
Expressways in Yunnan